Madanesvara Siva Temple is a Hindu temple dedicated to Lord Siva built around 12th century CE. It is situated on the left side of the Mahavir Lane branching from Garage Chowk in Santarapur to Sisupalgarh,	Bhubaneswar, Odisha, India. The enshrined deity is a Siva lingam within a circular yonipitha(basement). It is a broken shrine, and at present, only the Pabhaga portion is available.

Architecture and structure 
The temple is surrounded by residential buildings on three sides of north, west and east and the road in the south. The temple faces east and has a square sanctum. The superstructure has collapsed since long and the renovated pabhaga with five mouldings which include khura, kumbha, pata, kani and basanta is currently in existence.

See also
 List of temples in Bhubaneswar

References 
 Book: Lesser Known Monuments of Bhubaneswar by Dr. Sadasiba Pradhan

External links
 http://www.ignca.gov.in/asi_reports/orkhurda113.pdf

Hindu temples in Bhubaneswar
Shiva temples in Odisha
12th-century Hindu temples